(), is a term for Daoist incantations and magic symbols, written or painted as talisman or  by Daoist practitioners.

These practitioners are also called  or the  sect, an informal group made up of priests from different schools of Daoism.

Etymology  

  is a register of the membership of the priests, as well as the skills they are trained in.

General design 
Fu symbols tend to have irregular strokes that resemble Traditional Chinese characters, often elongating existing words while incorporating non- symbols. Daoist priests are the main interpreters of this eclectic writing-and-symbol system, and the characters can differ from sect to sect. The method of writing down these characters is generally passed down in secret from a Daoist priest to their disciples and treated as a special craft with which to communicate to local deities and spirits. 

Some magic script characters appear to have been formed by stacking one Traditional Chinese character atop of another character and compounding them into one. Fu styles vary from sect to sect and each sect has different incantations and mudras used to create Fu. Even the invocations for a single deity will vary between sects. This specific technique of linking or combining different Chinese characters was not used exclusively by the Daoists, however. Fu characters also appear on other types of Chinese charms such as Buddhist coin charms and woodblock print charms.

Healthcare 
Talismans have for centuries been used in China as a healing method alongside medicinal drugs, meditation, acupuncture, astrology and massage.

Whilst rejected by Traditional Chinese Medicine,  continues to be widely used amongst Chinese folk healers today. Following the popularisation of psychology in early-twentieth century China,  began to be interpreted as the Chinese version of Western hypnosis.

Daoist scripture 

On talismanic coins 

 

Fu script was also used on Daoist coin talismans (many of which resemble cash coins). Many of these talismans haven't been deciphered yet but a specimen where Fu was used next to what is believed to be their equivalent Chinese characters exists. On rare occasions Daoist  writing has also been found on Buddhist numismatic charms and amulets. Most of these coin talismans that feature  writings request Lei Gong to protect its carriers from evil spirits and misfortune. 

 characters are usually included at the beginning and the end of the inscription of a Daoist coin charm.

See also

References 

Amulets
Talismans
Taoist practices
Chinese culture
Exorcism
Chinese words and phrases
Incantation
Eastern esotericism